Davante Gardner (born September 2, 1991) is an American professional basketball player for SeaHorses Mikawa in Japan. He played college basketball at Marquette University.

College statistics

|-
| align="left" | 2010–11
| align="left" | Marquette
| 33 || 0 || 9.0 || .576 || – || .754 || 2.2 || 0.3 || 0.1 || 0.2 || 4.6
|-
| align="left" | 2011–12
| align="left" | Marquette
| 27 || 11 || 19.1 || .561 || .000 || .755 || 5.3 || 0.7 || 0.8 || 0.2 || 9.5
|-
| align="left" | 2012–13
| align="left" | Marquette
| 35 || 0 || 21.4 || .585 || .200 || .835 || 4.8 || 0.9 || 0.7 || 0.6 || 11.5
|-
| align="left" | 2013–14
| align="left" | Marquette
| 32 || 8 || 26.6 || .528 || .125 || .781 || 5.7 || 1.3 || 0.3 || 0.5 || 14.9
|-bgcolor=#e9d9ff
| align="left" | Total
| align="left" |
| 127 || 19 || 19.0 || .557 || .130 || .790 || 4.5 || 0.8 || 0.5 || 0.4 || 10.1
|}

Career statistics 

|-
| align="left" | 2014–15
| align="left" | Hyères-Toulon Var
|36  ||33 ||27.9 ||.608  ||.364 || .836 || 6.75 ||1.03  ||0.89 ||0.47 || 15.83
|-

|-
| align="left" | 2015–16
| align="left" | Nishinomiya
|54  ||53 ||36.6 ||.523  ||.356 || .756 || 10.6 ||1.9  ||1.1 ||0.6 ||bgcolor="CFECEC"| 27.8
|-

| align="left" | 2016–17
| align="left" | Niigata
| 54 || 51 || 26.7 ||.553  || .303 || .780 || 8.8 ||1.7  ||0.8 ||0.5 || 21.9
|-
| align="left" | 2017–18
| align="left" | Niigata
|59  ||59 ||30.0  ||.570  ||.295 ||.843  || 10.0 ||2.5  ||0.8 ||0.6 || bgcolor="CFECEC"|28.7
|-
| align="left" | 2018–19
| align="left" | Niigata
|bgcolor="CFECEC"|60  ||bgcolor="CFECEC"|60 ||36.0  ||.576  ||.228 ||.793  || 10.9 ||3.8  ||0.6 ||0.4 || bgcolor="CFECEC"|27.6
|-
|}

References

External links
Marquette Golden Eagles bio

1991 births
Living people
American expatriate basketball people in France
American expatriate basketball people in Japan
American men's basketball players
Basketball players from Virginia
HTV Basket players
Marquette Golden Eagles men's basketball players
Niigata Albirex BB players
Nishinomiya Storks players
Power forwards (basketball)
SeaHorses Mikawa players
Sportspeople from Suffolk, Virginia